Project Bandaloop, now named BANDALOOP is an aerial dance company, founded in 1991 by Amelia Rudolph, the company combines dance with rock climbing technology, sport, ritual, and environmental awareness.

See also
Aerial Dance

References

External links
 BANDALOOP home page www.BANDALOOP.org
 "Project Bandaloop, Dance in a Different Light". The Kennedy Center ArtsEdge https://web.archive.org/web/20061206221256/http://artsedge.kennedy-center.org/content/3496/

Dance organizations